The Manchester Camerata is a British chamber orchestra based in Manchester, England.  

Manchester Camerata prides itself on an original combination of craft and courage. With 5 star reviews from The Independent, as well as the accolade of being hailed ‘Britain’s most adventurous orchestra’ (The Times), Camerata is as comfortable opening Glastonbury Festival as it is recording Mozart at the highest level. They are passionate about the traditional craft of an orchestra and how it is evolving. By excelling artistically and having the courage to prioritise bold, compelling and diverse projects, Camerata makes a positive difference not only to their audiences but to the health and wellbeing of their communities as well.

In 1972, Raph Gonley, a music producer at BBC Radio Manchester, founded the orchestra.  Gonley ran the Camerata until 1975.  Funding for the Camerata after its initial period came from the Greater Manchester Council.  The Camerata became an autonomous organisation in 1979.

The Camerata's first principal conductor was Frank Cliff, who served from 1972 to 1977.  Subsequent principal conductors have included Szymon Goldberg, Manoug Parikian, Nicholas Braithwaite, and Sachio Fujioka.  Braithwaite had also been principal guest conductor of the orchestra from 1977 to 1984.  Douglas Boyd was principal conductor of the orchestra from 2001 to 2011.  In March 2010, the orchestra announced the appointment of Gábor Takács-Nagy as the orchestra's newest principal conductor, effective September 2011.  Nicholas Kraemer serves as the Camerata's permanent guest conductor.

Bob Riley is the orchestra's current chief executive.

In 2021, the Manchester Camerata moved into a new home at Gorton Monastery, a large Victorian church built in 1872 by the noted Gothic Revival architect Edward Welby Pugin.

Principal conductors
 Frank Cliff (1972–1977)
 Szymon Goldberg (1977–1980)
 Manoug Parikian (1980–1984)
 Nicholas Braithwaite (1984–1991)
 Sachio Fujioka (1995–2000)
 Douglas Boyd (2001–2011)
 Gábor Takács-Nagy (2011–present)

References

External links
 Official homepage of the Manchester Camerata
 "Camerata's founder Raph Gonley has died".  Manchester Camerata magazine, 5 December 2012

Chamber orchestras
English orchestras
Musical groups from Manchester
Musical groups established in 1972